Ivan is a Slavic male given name.

Ivan may also refer to:

Arts and entertainment
Ivan (1932 film), a Soviet drama film 
Ivan (2002 film), a Tamil-language film
Ivan (2017 film), a Slovenian drama film
Ivan, Son of the White Devil, also known as Ivan, a 1953 Italian adventure film 
Ivan (short story), by Vladimir Bogomolov, basis of the film Ivan's Childhood
"Ivan" (The Blacklist, an episode of the TV series
Ivan (Cars), a fictional character in the films
Ivan (Golden Sun), a fictional character in the game series
Ivan (musician), one-time name used by musician Jerry Allison, under which he recorded "Real Wild Child"

Places
Ivan, Ontario, Canada
Ivaň (Brno-Country District), Czech Republic
Ivaň (Prostějov District), Czech Republic
Iván, Hungary
Ivan, Russia
Ivan, Arkansas, U.S.
Ivan, West Virginia, U.S.
Ivan planina, or Ivan Mountain, in Bosnia and Herzegovina
Ivan River, Romania

Other uses
Ivan (crater), on the Moon
Ivan (gorilla) (1962–2012), a zoo animal
Ivan, codename of Tsar Bomba, the Soviet RDS-202 hydrogen bomb
Ivan, or iwan, a rectangular hall or space commonly associated with Islamic architecture
Tropical Storm Ivan, the name of a number of tropical storms
Ivan (model), Japanese fashion model

See also

Ivan Ivanovich (disambiguation)
Ivaň (disambiguation)
Ivana (disambiguation)
Iwan (disambiguation)